The 1957–58 Detroit Red Wings season was the Red Wings' 32nd season. The season involved sending Ted Lindsay and Glenn Hall to the Chicago Black Hawks.

Offseason
 July 23, 1957 – The Chicago Black Hawks acquired Ted Lindsay and Glenn Hall from the Detroit Red Wings in exchange for Johnny Wilson, Forbes Kennedy, Hank Bassen, and Bill Preston.

Regular season

Final standings

Record vs. opponents

Schedule and results

Player statistics

Regular season
Scoring

Goaltending

Playoffs
Scoring

Goaltending

Note: GP = Games played; G = Goals; A = Assists; Pts = Points; +/- = Plus-minus PIM = Penalty minutes; PPG = Power-play goals; SHG = Short-handed goals; GWG = Game-winning goals;
      MIN = Minutes played; W = Wins; L = Losses; T = Ties; GA = Goals against; GAA = Goals-against average;  SO = Shutouts;

References
Red Wings on Hockey Database

Detroit
Detroit
Detroit Red Wings seasons
Detroit Red Wings
Detroit Red Wings